Mount Stephen, is a mountain located in the Kicking Horse River Valley of Yoho National Park,  km east of Field, British Columbia, Canada. The mountain was named in 1886 for George Stephen, the first president of the Canadian Pacific Railway. The mountain is mainly composed of shales and dolomites from the Cambrian Period, some 550 million years ago. The Stephen Formation, a stratigraphical unit of the Western Canadian Sedimentary Basin was first described at the mountain and was named for it.  Stephen has a subpeak known as Stephen SE1, at the end of a 1 km ridge, 132° from the main peak, visible from Lake O'Hara.

Climbing 
The first ascent was made on September 9, 1887 by James. J. McArthur and his assistant T. Riley, which was made even more difficult by the surveying equipment they also carried with them. Unfortunately for them, smoke from forest fires limited visibility from the top. Beginning at 4:30 am, it took them four hours to pierce dense forest to reach tree line. After another three hours, the final rocks were reached which bore the inscription "Hill, Whatley, Ross, September 6, 1886". Above the rocks, they had to navigate an ice couloir and a knife-edged arete before reaching the summit. Sometime between this ascent and one in 1892, an estimated  of rock had fallen in the upper section of the mountain, making the climb notably easier.

A cornice on the summit may prevent parties from reaching the top so if in doubt of conditions, attempts should wait until August. The route also passes through a fossil bed and thus requires a special park permit to be in the area.

For rock climbers, a route on the north ridge is rated III 5.7 with generally good rock formations composed mainly of quartzite.

Climate
Based on the Köppen climate classification, Mount Stephen is located in a subarctic climate zone with cold, snowy winters, and mild summers. Temperatures can drop below -20 °C with wind chill factors below -30 °C. Weather conditions during winter make Mount Stephen one of the better places in the Rockies for ice climbing. Precipitation runoff from Mount Stephen drains into the Kicking Horse River.

See also
 Mount Stephen trilobite beds
 Mount Stephen House

References

Gallery

Three-thousanders of British Columbia
Mountains of Yoho National Park
Kootenay Land District